Nicolaas Maartin Vergunst (born 1 September 1958, in Cape Town) is the author of Knot of Stone: the day that changed South Africa's history. Knot of Stone is a historical murder mystery about the first recorded massacre and earliest known murder in South African history, and published in the United Kingdom and United States in 2011 by Arena Books.

Biography
Nicolaas Vergunst studied fine arts and cultural history at Stellenbosch University and the University of KwaZulu-Natal. From 1988–2004 he worked at the South African National Gallery in Cape Town (later assimilated into Iziko South African Museum) where he curated Hoerikwaggo: Images of Table Mountain, an exhibition about the ever-shifting European perceptions of the South African landscape. The book produced for this exhibition had several reprints and is now a collector's item.

References

External links
 Website Knot of Stone
 Arena Books Publishers
 Iziko Museums of South Africa

1958 births
Living people
South African male novelists
Dutch writers
Writers from Cape Town
People from Stellenbosch